Isthmura gigantea, commonly known as the giant false brook salamander, is a species of salamander in the family Plethodontidae. It is endemic to Mexico and known from the eastern margins Sierra Madre Oriental between north-eastern Hidalgo and northern Puebla and central Veracruz near Xalapa.

It tolerates some habitat disturbance but is threatened from severe habitat loss from logging, mining, agriculture, and human settlement that is occurring  within its range.

References

gigantea
Amphibians described in 1939
Endemic amphibians of Mexico
Fauna of the Sierra Madre Oriental
Taxonomy articles created by Polbot